Icehouse Canyon is a census-designated place (CDP) in Gila County, Arizona, United States. The population was 677 at the 2010 census.

Geography
The CDP is located in southern Gila County, bordered to the north by the city of Globe, the county seat, and to the east by the Six Shooter Canyon CDP. Icehouse Canyon is a mountain valley that extends southwest up into Tonto National Forest. The mouth of the canyon is at its northern end, at Pinal Creek, which flows northwest through the center of Globe. Residences in the community are built along Icehouse Canyon Road and along Kellner Canyon Road, which branches to the west-southwest off Icehouse Canyon.

Demographics

References

Census-designated places in Gila County, Arizona